Seham El Sawalhy (born 14 April 1991, in Beheira) is an Egyptian taekwondo practitioner. She competed in the 67 kg event at the 2012 Summer Olympics and was eliminated by Elin Johansson in the preliminary round.  She competed in the same event at the 2016 Summer Olympics, and was eliminated by Ruth Gbagbi in the first round.

References

1991 births
Living people
Egyptian female taekwondo practitioners
Olympic taekwondo practitioners of Egypt
Taekwondo practitioners at the 2012 Summer Olympics
People from Beheira Governorate
Taekwondo practitioners at the 2016 Summer Olympics
African Games gold medalists for Egypt
African Games medalists in taekwondo
Competitors at the 2011 All-Africa Games
20th-century Egyptian women
21st-century Egyptian women